Empress Huyan (呼延皇后) may refer to one of several empresses of the Sixteen Kingdoms of Chinese history:

 Empress Huyan (Liu Yuan's wife), wife of Han Zhao's founding emperor Liu Yuan
 Empress Huyan (Liu Cong's wife), wife of Liu Yuan's son Liu Cong
 Empress Huyan (Southern Yan), wife of Southern Yan's emperor Murong Chao

Huyan